Rashmijan (also Romanized as Rashmījān; also known as Rashmījān-e Kalāntarī) is a village in Kenareh Rural District, in the Central District of Marvdasht County, Fars Province, Iran. At the 2006 census, its population was 739, in 173 families.

References 

Populated places in Marvdasht County